Artur Ratajczak (born 18 September 1990) is a Polish volleyball player, a member of Polish club MKS Będzin.

Career

Clubs
In 2013 he came back to LOTOS Trefl Gdańsk. In June 2014 signed new one-year contract with club from Gdańsk. On 19 April 2015 LOTOS Trefl Gdańsk, including Ratajczak, achieved Polish Cup 2015. Then he won silver medal of Polish Championship.

Sporting achievements

Clubs
 National championships
 2014/2015  Polish Cup, with LOTOS Trefl Gdańsk
 2014/2015  Polish Championship, with LOTOS Trefl Gdańsk
 2015/2016  Polish SuperCup, with LOTOS Trefl Gdańsk

References

External links
 PlusLiga player profile

1990 births
Living people
People from Gostyń
Sportspeople from Greater Poland Voivodeship
Polish men's volleyball players
Trefl Gdańsk players
MKS Będzin players